Mark Meyer (born September 3, 1963) is a Wisconsin Democratic politician and legislator.

Born in La Crosse, Wisconsin, Meyer graduated from University of Wisconsin–La Crosse and served on the La Crosse Common Council. Meyer served in the Wisconsin State Assembly 1993–2001. In 2001, he served in the Wisconsin State Senate until 2004. In 2004, Governor Jim Doyle appointed Meyer as commissioner of the Public Service Commission of Wisconsin to replace Ave Bie. He served a full 6-year term until he was replaced by Phil Montgomery in 2010.

References

1963 births
Living people
Politicians from La Crosse, Wisconsin
University of Wisconsin–La Crosse alumni
Wisconsin city council members
Members of the Wisconsin State Assembly
Wisconsin state senators
21st-century American politicians